Örtofta Castle is a castle in Eslöv Municipality in Scania,  Sweden.

History
At the end of the 15th century, a castle-like main building was built, the remains of which are still part of the old part of the current structure. It was probably Tönne Vernersen Parsberg, who died in 1521, had the permanent structure built, of which remains are still included in the old part of the current castle. Through inheritance, Örtofta came to belong to members of several noble families  including members of the Barnekow family. Renovation  were made to the estate and surrounding the baroque park. During the 1860s, the castle and its outbuildings took on their current form.

See also
List of castles in Sweden

References

External links
Örtofta slott website

Castles in Skåne County
15th-century establishments in Skåne County